Yisrael Yeshayahu Sharabi (20 April 1908 – 20 June 1979) was an Israeli politician, minister and the fifth Speaker of the Knesset.

Biography
Born in Sadeh, Yemen, to a Jewish weaver by trade, he was sent to Sana'a at an early age where he studied under Rabbi Yihya Qafih (d. 1931). Yeshayahu soon became a member of the Dor Daim movement, before making aliyah in 1929. He became head of the Yemenite Immigrant and Eastern Jewry Department of the Histadrut in 1934, a position he retained until 1948 when he started organizing the immigration of Yemenite Jews, including Operation Magic Carpet.

A member of the Tel Aviv Workers Council, he was also a delegate to the Zionist Congress and the Assembly of Representatives. He served Deputy Secretary of Government and communications officer between the Government and the Knesset between 1948 and 1949.

He narrowly missed out on being elected to the first Knesset in 1949, but entered it in 1951 after the death of Knesset and Mapai party member Avraham Tabib, and was suddenly advanced from the seventy-seventh ranking member of the Mapai party to the twenty-ninth ranking member, displacing Aryeh Sheftel. Yeshayahu retained his seat in the Israeli Parliament (Knesset) in every election for the next twenty-six years, until 1977. He was appointed Minister of Postal Services in 1967, a role he retained until the 1969 elections. After serving as Secretary General of the Labour Party between 1971 and 1972, he was made Speaker of the Knesset in 1972, a role he retained until 1977.

At the age of twelve, he studied under the great Yemenite Rabbi and scholar, Yosef Qafih. In Yemen, he belonged to the Baladi-rite congregations of Yemenite Jews and active in the Dor Daim community, although he was originally from a community that embraced the Shami-rite. Yisrael Yeshayahu co-edited a book with Aharon Tzadok in 1945.

References

External links

1908 births
1979 deaths
Yemeni emigrants to Mandatory Palestine
Yemenite Jews
Israeli people of Yemeni-Jewish descent
Alignment (Israel) politicians
Israeli Labor Party politicians
Mapai politicians
Members of the Assembly of Representatives (Mandatory Palestine)
Members of the 1st Knesset (1949–1951)
Members of the 2nd Knesset (1951–1955)
Members of the 3rd Knesset (1955–1959)
Members of the 4th Knesset (1959–1961)
Members of the 5th Knesset (1961–1965)
Members of the 6th Knesset (1965–1969)
Members of the 7th Knesset (1969–1974)
Members of the 8th Knesset (1974–1977)
Speakers of the Knesset
Ministers of Communications of Israel